Seema Jaswal is a TV Presenter working for BT Sports, ITV, BBC, DAZN and the Premier League. Jaswal presented the FIFA World Cup Qatar 2022 with ITV. Jaswal is the first woman to present a Men’s World Cup Quarter final for a UK Broadcaster – Morocco vs Portugal for ITV. Jaswal was also the main presenter for the historic all-female on-screen panel for a Men’s World Cup game – Saudi Arabia vs Poland.

Jaswal hosts the Champions League on BT Sport, the Premier League’s Matchday Live global coverage, the FA Cup live matches and all draws for the 2021/22 season on ITV as well as the BBC’s Snooker coverage for all triple crown events. Jaswal presented the Euro 2020 for ITV.

Early life and education 
Jaswal was born and brought up in England. She completed her schooling at Grey Court School and graduated from Royal Holloway, University of London. Jaswal says she is enthusiastic about sports, particularly tennis.

Career 
A sports enthusiast, Jaswal kick-started her career as a runner at Sky Sports as part of the production, which was her springboard to presenting.

Sky Sports 
As a runner, Jaswal logged sports results, sourced footage clips in the rushes and assisted studio floor managers before progressing to Sports Saturday for Sky Sports News. This position required overseeing live sports footage and clipping the relevant footage ready for broadcast!

Jaswal spent the best part of the year presenting live events and working as a freelance production assistant including hosting the Zee Carnival at The Olympia Hall in Kensington to an audience of 3000, The Franchise Show for The Business Channel, presenting The Independent Music Show in Camden and MTV and Endemol projects.

2009 - 2011 
Signed by talent agent Jo Carlton at Talent4 Media in 2009, Seema cut her teeth by presenting CBBC Newsround as Sportsround’s roving reporter. That included shooting with the Chelsea Ladies football team, sailing in Weymouth with Olympic Sailor Paul Goodison, show jumping with Dan Neilson, travelling to Cyprus with the England Ladies Football team for the Cyprus Cup and playing tennis against Britain’s Laura Robson.

In July 2011, Jaswal became co-host to Matthew Wright on Channel Five’s The Wright Stuff. This show draws upon daily topical issues.

London Olympic 
Jaswal hosted the Table Tennis at the London 2012 Olympic Test Event. She presented to an audience of 3000 at London’s Excel Centre while keeping the audience informed of scores and information about the players. Seema also interviewed many of the international players via a translator.

Charity Ambassador 
Off-screen, as an Ambassador for the charity Just a Drop, Jaswal has hosted a variety of charity press days and was also responsible for starting the race for Sport’s Relief in West London’s Bushy park.

2012 - Present 
As a producer and presenter for the Entertainment Show on London’s Westside radio, Jaswal talked about entertainment topics every Sunday from 10am - 1pm. She wrote the show content and featured a weekly event update, entertainment news bulletins, interviews with artists performing at the local Beck Theatre, the Hot or Not debate, chart-topping tracks, and old-school classics!

Most recently, Seema has revisited her sport roots by reporting for CBBC’s Match of the Day Kickabout. This role sees Seema travelling the country and meeting young football stars whilst setting them various challenges.

She was a TV anchor at Indian Super League 2015 for the Star Sports show Lets Talk Football. She also anchors on channel Ten 2 for India's 2017 FIFA U-17 World Cup.

Television 
Jaswal has worked for several television channels:

 Let's Talk Football - Star Sports
 The Wright Stuff - Channel 5
 Match of the Day Kickabout - CBBC
 The Franchise Show - The Business Channel

Radio 
Jaswal has hosted three shows for Westside Radio:

 The Entertainment Show
 The Voice
 Drivetime

Events 

 2017 Mini Challenge Round 1 at the Oulton Park Circuit in Cheshire, England.
 Indian Premier League 2017 FIFA U-17 World Cup.

References

External links
 
 

Living people
English television presenters
English radio presenters
English people of Indian descent
British VJs (media personalities)
Year of birth missing (living people)